The Rhythm & Roots Tour was the fourteenth headlining concert tour by American country music trio Rascal Flatts. It began on June 17, 2016 in Charlotte, North Carolina and ended on October 8 of that year in Reading, Pennsylvania.

Background
The tour was first announced on March 4, 2016. About the tour Jay DeMarcus says, "It's really important to us that each year our shows are fresh and exciting for our fans,". "We put a lot of thought into how to do that this year and mixing it up in Vegas was really fun so we decided to continue with this new change of pace out on the road this summer, so we can share it with more of our fans. We're really excited to have such great support this year with Kelsea and Chris too, it's going to be a blast!"

Concert synopsis
As the show begins the opening notes of "Summer Nights" can be heard behind a black curtain, then the curtains go up and the band is revealed. During "Rewind" there are video clips highlighting some of the groups best moments like when they met Muhammed Ali, Disney characters, and receiving a star on the Hollywood Walk of Fame.

Stage design
There are three video screens, the trio and keyboardist stand in front other tour band members who stand on risers.

Opening acts
Kelsea Ballerini
Chris Lane
Chase Bryant

Setlist

"Summer Nights"
"I Like the Sound of That"
"Banjo"
"Come Wake Me Up"/"I Melt"/"I Won't Let Go"
"Life Is a Highway" 
"Forever Young"
"Bless the Broken Road" 
"Rewind"
"Fast Cars and Freedom"
"Purple Rain" 
"Love You Out Loud"
"My Wish"
"Take Me There"
"What Hurts the Most" 
"Here's to You"
"Me and My Gang"

Tour dates

List of festivals and fair

Critical reception
Elisabeth Arriero, a correspondent for The Charlotte Observer says, "There's a reason why Rascal Flatts can still fill up venues like PNC Music Pavilino after 16 consecutive years on tour: They have this live performance bit down to a science without losing any of the enthusiasm or heart."

References

2016 concert tours
Rascal Flatts concert tours